Daniel Costa may refer to:

Daniel Costa (Brazilian footballer) (born 1988), football defender
Daniel Costa (Portuguese footballer) (born 2000), football forward
Daniel Costa Teixeira de Souza, stage name Daniel Satti, Brazilian actor